Nadia Afgan is a Pakistani actress who appears in Urdu films and television and films. She is known for her work in theatre and television. Her numerous work in television includes a series of plays in both Urdu and Punjabi. She rose to prominence when she appeared in the hit TV serial Family Front in 1997. Further success came in 2000 with the PTV Home's most-memorable sitcom Shashlik which was later re-aired on Geo TV in 2011. Afghan garnered wider appreciation for her comic role in the Hum TV's blockbuster comedy drama Suno Chanda (2018), and for its sequel Suno Chanda 2, as Shahana Batool the following year.

Life and career 
Nadia started her career as an actress from PTV Lahore Center. Later she acted in many PTV drama serials and hosted many shows and PTV night time transmission for many years and now she is being seen in different serials on all the public and private channels in Pakistan. Her credited roles are in Shashlik, Raju Rocket and Bilqees Kaur. She also acted in Banana News Network, aired on Geo News. In 2018, Nadia directed drama serial Parlour Wali Larki.

Filmography

Film

Television

References

External links 

Living people
1970 births
Pakistani television actresses
Pakistani television directors
Pakistani television producers
Pakistani women comedians
Actresses from Lahore
People from Lahore
20th-century Pakistani actresses
21st-century Pakistani actresses
Women television producers
Women television directors